The Committee of Selection is a select committee of the House of Commons in the Parliament of the United Kingdom. Unlike the Commons' other select committees, the Committee of Selection exists by virtue of the House's Standing Orders for Private Business, its rules for bills that affect only specific organizations or individuals. Despite that, the committee is best known for appointing members of committees established under resolutions of the House and the Standing Orders for Public Business.

With few exceptions, notably the Committee of Selection itself, the Standards and Privileges Committee, and the Liaison Committee, only members of the committee acting on its behalf may nominate new members to committees or propose the discharge of members. Appointments to select committees are made through motions put before the House of Commons, while appointments to general committees (such as public bill committees) are made by the committee's own authority. With respect to private business, all private bills are automatically referred to the committee, which in turn either refers unopposed bills to the Unopposed Bill Committee and refers opposed bills to committees whose members it also appoints.

Role in the selection of public bill committees
The Committee of Selection performs a crucial, yet often overlooked function in scrutinising legislation. The current structure of the committee is dominated by party whips. This means that the government effectively chooses which MPs will scrutinise its bills. Advocates of reform highlight that the current organisation of the committee means that MPs who are subject specialists or may hold views contrary to the leadership of their party can be kept off public bill committees. Suggested reforms include limiting the number of whips that can serve on the committee and allowing MPs a vote on public bill committee nominations.

Current members
Members are elected at the beginning of each session. As of October 2022 the committee's membership is as follows:

See also
Parliamentary committees of the United Kingdom

References

External links
Committee of Selection
Records for this Committee are held at the Parliamentary Archives

Select Committees of the British House of Commons